Abdelgani Abdel Fattah (born 23 October 1920) was an Egyptian long-distance runner. He competed in the marathon at the 1952 Summer Olympics.

References

External links
 

1920 births
Year of death missing
Athletes (track and field) at the 1952 Summer Olympics
Egyptian male long-distance runners
Egyptian male marathon runners
Olympic athletes of Egypt
Place of birth missing